Idols 3 was the third season of the Dutch version of Idols hosted by Martijn Krabbé & Chantal Janzen. The winner was Raffaëla Paton with Floortje Smit as runner-up.

Summaries

Contestants
(ages stated are at time of contest)
(in order of elimination)
Renske van der Veer, 25
Ariel Sietses, 28
Charissa van Veldt, 26
I-Jay Cairo, 33
Christon Kloosterboer, 23
Marescha van der Stelt, 23
Aäron Ayal, 17
Serge Gulikers, 23
Harm Jacobs, 29
Angelique Koorndijk, 34
Ellen Eeftink, 23
Floortje Smit, 22 (runner-up)
Raffaëla Paton, 22 (winner)

Liveshow Themes
Liveshow 1 (December 31, 2005): Music Out Own Birth Year
Liveshow 2 (January 7, 2006): Dutch Artists
Liveshow 3 (January 14, 2006): Jukebox
Liveshow 4 (January 21, 2006): Rock
Liveshow 5 (January 28, 2006): 2000s (decade)
Liveshow 6 (February 4, 2006): Disco
Liveshow 7 (February 11, 2006): Love Songs
Liveshow 8 (February 18, 2006): Dutch Songs
Liveshow 9 (February 25, 2006): Big Band
Liveshow 10 (March 4, 2006): Choices
Final Liveshow (March 11, 2006)

Judges
Henkjan Smits
Eric van Tijn
Jerney Kaagman

Finals

Live show details

Heat 1 (3 December 2005)

Notes
The judges selected Christon Kloosterboer to move on into the Top 13 of the competition, before the hosts revealed the Top 4 vote getters. Floortje Smit, Charissa van Veldt and I-Jay Cairo advanced to the top 13 of the competition. The other 5 contestants were eliminated.
Merle Hendriks and Sonny Sinay returned for a second chance at the top 13 in the Wildcard Round.

Heat 2 (10 December 2005)

Notes
The judges selected Renske van der Veer to move on into the Top 13 of the competition, before the hosts revealed the Top 4 vote getters. Aäron Ayal, Angelique Koorndijk and Ariel Sietses advanced to the top 13 of the competition. The other 5 contestants were eliminated.
Clarissa and Davide La Cara www.davide.nl returned for a second chance at the top 13 in the Wildcard Round.

Heat 3 (17 December 2005)

Notes
The judges selected Ellen Eeftink to move on into the Top 13 of the competition, before the hosts revealed the Top 4 vote getters. Raffaëla Paton, Harm Jacobs and Marescha van der Stelt advanced to the top 13 of the competition. The other 5 contestants were eliminated.
Aisata Blackman and Serge Gulikers returned for a second chance at the top 13 in the Wildcard Round.

Wildcard round (24 December 2005)

Notes
Serge Gulikers received the most votes, and completed the top 13.

Live Show 1 (31 December 2005)
Theme: My Birth Year

Live Show 2 (7 January 2006)
Theme: Dutch Artists

Live Show 3 (14 January 2006)
Theme: Jukebox

Live Show 4 (21 January 2006)
Theme: Rock

Live Show 5 (28 January 2006)
Theme: Hits 2000

Live Show 6 (4 February 2006)
Theme: Disco

Live Show 7 (11 February 2006)
Theme: Love Songs

Live Show 8 (18 February 2006)
Theme: Dutch Hits

Live Show 9 (25 February 2006)
Theme: Big Band

Live Show 10: Semi-final (4 March 2006)
Theme: Choices

Live final (11 March 2006)

Season 03
2005 Dutch television seasons
2006 Dutch television seasons